Shimla Mirchi is a 2020 Indian Hindi-language romantic drama film directed by Ramesh Sippy, starring Hema Malini, Rajkummar Rao and Rakul Preet Singh. It is jointly produced by Ramesh Sippy, Rohan Sippy and Kiran Juneja. The film had a 5 years delay due to no buyer to buy the film. It was theatrically released in India on 3 January 2020.

Plot

Avinash, former translator at Japanese Embassy in India, visits a temple with his family, where he meets beautiful Naina and falls for her. His family also encounters Naina in another scene and likes her very much and wants Avi to marry her. To court Naina, Avi stays around the temple and works at her coffee shop that is about to open.

Naina's parents have separated for long. Her father Tilak even has a new girlfriend around her age. However, her mother Rukmini is always unwilling to sign the divorce paper because she still loves Tilak, and she is having depression due to the situation.

Avi successfully befriends Naina, and sends her an anonymous love letter, which however annoys her but gives her and idea to cheer up her mom. She writes the same letter to her mom, which successfully cheers up the latter and Rukmini decides to find the secret lover.

Meanwhile, Naina gets suspicious about Avi's over-excellence in the job, assuming he is not here to work for her, but to gradually take over the cafe. She fires him, but he says he will stay another month because according to the law, an employer must not fire an employee without noticing him in advance for at least a month.

Accidentally, Rukmini mistakes Avi as her secret lover. Naina therefore request Avi to help, by pretending to be the secret lover for a few days. Avi agrees.

After that, Avi realizes Naina is not interested in him at all, and even gets angry when receiving his love letter and that she just wants to use him to cheer up her mom. Upset Avi leaves Naina, but tells her that he was her actual secret lover before leaving.

Rukmini also realizes that Avi loves Naina, and Naina finds out that she loves Avi too. Some time later, Naina receives wedding invitation from Avi. Shocked Naina immediately visits Avi, and asks him to cancel the wedding and marry her instead. Avi agrees.

It is finally revealed that Avi was not actually going to marry. The wedding invitation is a plan made up with by Rukmini to re-unite the two lovers. Later in Avi and Naina's wedding, Rukmini meets and reconciles with one of her former lover (Dharmendra)

Cast
 Hema Malini as Rukmini "Mini"
 Rajkummar Rao as Avinash "Avi" 
 Rakul Preet Singh as Naina
 Shakti Kapoor as Captain Uncle
 Kiran Juneja as Kannu Bua 
 Kanwaljit Singh as Tilak "Tiku"
 Kamlesh Gill as Daadi
 Tarun Wadhwa as Jude
 Priya Raina as Sonu
 Tawhid Rike Zaman as Naina's Friend
 Jagruti Sethia as Mishti
 Nita Mohindra as Avinash's mother
 Zoya Khan as Brownie
 Dharmendra as a guest appearance, Foreign Minister
 Ramesh Sippy as a guest appearance, a person reading a book on the bench

Release
It was theatrically released in India on 3 January 2020. And it was made available on Netflix on 27 January 2020.

Soundtrack 

This film's soundtrack is composed by Meet Bros Anjjan with lyrics written by Kumaar.

References

External links
 
 
 

2020 films
2020s Hindi-language films
Films set in Shimla
2020 romantic drama films
Indian romantic drama films
Films directed by Ramesh Sippy